Richard Wallace Mansbach (born 1943) is an American political scientist.

Mansbach studied political science, history, and Spanish at Swarthmore College and graduated in 1964. He then attended the University of Oxford as a Marshall Scholar. After completing his dissertation, Mansbach joined the Swarthmore College faculty, in 1967. He became an assistant professor in 1968. Mansbach remained at Swarthmore for two years. While teaching at Rutgers University, Mansbach was named a fellow of the American Council on Education in 1981, and worked for the Central Intelligence Agency. He later moved to Iowa State University. From 1999 to 2004, Mansbach was a co-editor of International Studies Quarterly. In 2017, the International Studies Association convened a Distinguished Scholar Panel to honor Mansbach and Yale H. Ferguson.

Selected books

 The authors shared the International Studies Association–Midwest Region's 1996 Lynne Rienner/Quincy Wright Award for their work.

References

1943 births
Living people
American political scientists
Swarthmore College alumni
Marshall Scholars
Alumni of the University of Oxford
Swarthmore College faculty
Rutgers University faculty
Iowa State University faculty
Political science journal editors
American expatriates in the United Kingdom
20th-century American male writers
21st-century American male writers